Tabron is a surname. Notable people with the surname include:

Chris Tabron (born 1981), American record producer
Eliot Tabron (born 1960), American sprinter